Brainshark was a privately held technology company based in Waltham, Massachusetts that provided a sales enablement platform and product suite. Bigtincan acquired Brainshark in August 2021.

Products 
Brainshark provided Web-based applications and products, delivered via software as a service (SaaS), to help companies improve sales effectiveness and productivity. The company offered a sales enablement platform and product suite.

The company's core product was Brainshark, a sales enablement platform that helped organizations create content used for sales training, onboarding, and coaching.

Brainshark launched its coaching platform in February 2016 

In October 2011, Brainshark released SlideShark, a mobile app for the Apple iPad and Apple iPhone that lets users properly display PowerPoint presentations on iOS devices. 

Brainshark was used in a wide range of industries, including insurance, healthcare, financial services, technology, non-profit, and others for training, sales and marketing, channel, and corporate communications.

References

External links 
 Company website
 Company blog
 Conversation with Andy Zimmerman, Brainshark CMO

Software companies based in Massachusetts
Presentation software
Internet properties established in 1999
Privately held companies based in Massachusetts
Companies based in Waltham, Massachusetts
American companies established in 1999
1999 establishments in Massachusetts
Defunct software companies of the United States